Dhoihir Dhoulkamal is a Comorian politician from Anjouan. He is currently serving as the Minister of Foreign Affairs since 28 September 2020 in Comoros.

References 

Living people
Government ministers of the Comoros
Comorian politicians
21st-century Comorian politicians
Year of birth missing (living people)